Ultimate Spider-Man and X-Men was a Marvel UK comic book series published by Panini Comics every four weeks. The title reprinted one issue of Ultimate Spider-Man and one issue of Ultimate X-Men in each issue.

History 
The title is a result of a merger of Ultimate Spider-Man and Ultimate X-Men, two separate titles formerly published by Panini. The merger was a result of the two titles reprinting comics faster than they were being published in the United States. The title has also reprinted the Ultimate Nightmare mini-series. It ceased publication in early 2009 due to lack of sales.

Prints

References

External links

Ultimate Marvel titles
Spider-Man titles
X-Men titles
Marvel UK titles
2005 comics debuts